Nemyšl is a municipality and village in Tábor District in the South Bohemian Region of the Czech Republic. It has about 300 inhabitants.

Administrative parts
Villages of Dědice, Dědičky, Hoštice, Prudice, Úlehle, Úraz and Záhoříčko are administrative parts of Nemyšl.

Notable people
Jindřich Waldes (1876–1941), entrepreneur

References

Villages in Tábor District